Alone & Acoustic is an album by the blues musicians Buddy Guy and Junior Wells, released in 1991. It was recorded in 1981, in Paris, France, while the two were touring. 

The album has sold more than 100,000 copies. Along with Damn Right, I've Got the Blues, it marked a return to commercial success for Guy.

Production
The album was produced by Didier Tricard. Guy played acoustic Guild guitars and Wells played harmonica; they both sang. Guy wrote three of the songs, including the opening "Give Me My Coat and Shoes". Ten tracks were originally released via an import album.

Critical reception

Rolling Stone called Alone & Acoustic "reflective and subdued," writing that "a warm spontaneity runs through the album." Robert Christgau praised ""High Heel Sneakers" and "Give Me My Coat and Shoes".

The Orlando Sentinel determined that Guy's playing "on 12-and six-string acoustics is uncomplicated but as awesome as any daredevil run he has played on his Stratocaster." The Chicago Tribune thought that "the extroverted Guy now sounds like a soft, lyrical Mississippi bluesman virtually singing to himself ... Wells remains a strong, dramatic, post-Muddy Waters singer, but the intimacy of the setting leads to his widening his already impressive dynamic range."

AllMusic wrote that "this is acoustic street-corner blues at its best, performed with incredible expressiveness, ease, and joy."

Track listing 
"Give Me My Coat and Shoes" - 3:49
"Big Boat (Buddy and Junior's Thing)" - 5:13
"Sweet Black Girl" (Wells) - 3:32
"Diggin' My Potatoes" - 4:28
"Don't Leave Me" (Wells) - 3:43
"Rollin' and Tumblin'" - 4:33
"I'm in the Mood" - 3:22
"High Heel Sneakers" - 4:56
"Wrong Doing Woman" - 3:00
"Cut You Loose" - 4:03
"Sally Mae" - 2:30
"Catfish Blues" - 3:33
"My Home's in the Delta" - 3:05
"Boogie Chillen" - 4:00
"Medley: Baby What You Want Me to Do/That's Allright" - 5:44

References

Buddy Guy albums
Junior Wells albums
1991 albums
Alligator Records albums